Baldelli may refer to:

 Ferdinando Baldelli (1886–1963), Italian Catholic Bishop
 Fortunato Baldelli (1935–2012), Italian Catholic Cardinal
 Giovanni Baldelli (1914–1986), Italian anarchist
 Lisa Baldelli-Hunt (born 1962), American politician
 Rocco Baldelli (born 1981), American baseball player
 Simone Baldelli (born 1976), Italian politician

See also:
 Baldelli ceramics